The 1978 Nebraska Cornhuskers football team represented the University of Nebraska–Lincoln in the 1978 NCAA Division I-A football season.  The team was coached by Tom Osborne and played their home games in Memorial Stadium in Lincoln, Nebraska.

Schedule

Roster

Depth chart

Coaching staff

Game summaries

Alabama

Tom Osborne brought his Nebraska Cornhuskers into Birmingham to face Bear Bryant's top-ranked Crimson Tide to start the 1978 season, and Nebraska put the first points on the board with a field goal halfway through the 1st quarter. However, the game belonged to Alabama for the rest of the day with no further answer from Nebraska. Alabama suffered no fumbles and rolled up twice as many ground yards as Nebraska.

California

The Golden Bears were on the scoreboard first, but the Cornhuskers came back to tie midway through the 2nd quarter with help from a tricky two-handoff pass play to set up a score. The score was still tied at 14 through the 3rd quarter, before a surge of scoring opened up in the 4th as both teams combined for 34 points. Nebraska led on the ground 302-76, while California owned the air 271-190, but the Cornhuskers had more points at the final whistle.

Hawaii

Nebraska rolled to a dominating 35-0 1st half lead, and eight Cornhusker players scored during the course of the game as Hawaii allowed 599 yards of offense in their futile attempts to slow the onslaught. Hawaii's only touchdown came on the heels of a Nebraska fumble, and the spread was by then far too great for the Warriors to pose a threat to the Cornhuskers.

Indiana

Nebraska scored on all of their first four possessions and jumped to a 28-lead in the 1st quarter, scoring more points than Indiana would muster on the entire day. Five Cornhusker runners found the end zone, as well as a Blackshirt who recovered a fumble, as Nebraska rolled up 613 yards of offense for the day.

Iowa State

Nebraska was the first on the board and never allowed Iowa State to join them afterwards, as they led 9-0 at halftime and tacked on 14 more before the final whistle, while capitalizing on two interceptions thrown by the Cyclones and holding Iowa State to just 82 yards of total offense at their own home field.

Kansas State

Kansas State made an effort to be competitive for a bit, but Nebraska kept going after obtaining a 14-7 halftime lead. The Wildcats were trailing by 28 before they put up their final 4th-quarter touchdown, which the Cornhuskers further marginalized with 13 additional points while posting their second consecutive 600+ yard game.

Colorado

Colorado jumped out to an 11-point lead in the 1st quarter, helped in part by a 100-yard kickoff return, but there would be no further Colorado points allowed as Nebraska tallied 49 straight unanswered points for a win, while recording their third consecutive game with over 600 yards of offense.

Oklahoma State

Oklahoma State held Nebraska to around half of the total offensive yards the Cornhuskers had accumulated in each of the last three games. Statistically it was close, as the Cowboys barely led in the air 110-99, while the Cornhuskers barely led on the ground 217-213, and the Cowboys also held the edge in 1st downs 17-15. But Nebraska scored a 42-yard field goal with 15 seconds left to play, going ahead by 8 and holding on for the win.

Kansas

Nebraska started slow, only leading by 7 after the 1st quarter, but then the game blew open when the Cornhuskers put up four unanswered touchdowns in the 2nd and five overall, leading 42-7 at the half. The Jayhawks gamely put up 14 more points before the day was over, but not nearly enough to catch up, let alone overcome the additional 21 posted by the Cornhuskers before the final whistle. Nebraska's 799 total yards of offense set a new Big 8 record.

Oklahoma

The game was the biggest since the original Nebraska-Oklahoma Game of the Century in 1971, as the top-ranked and undefeated Oklahoma Sooners arrived in Lincoln to defend their ranking and possibly settle the 1978 Big 8 title with Nebraska.  Oklahoma put up the first score, which was matched by Nebraska by halftime, and the game was still tied at 14 at the start of the 4th quarter.  Nebraska put up the go-ahead field goal just minutes into the 4th, and the ensuing battle pitted the vaunted Oklahoma offense against the stalwart Blackshirts, who held until the end, finally forcing Oklahoma RB Billy Sims to fumble on the Nebraska 3 with 3:27 remaining to play and sealing the first Cornhusker victory over the Sooners since the famous 1971 contest.

Missouri

The Cornhuskers were riding high from their win over #1 Oklahoma, but the Missouri Tigers downed the Cornhuskers in Lincoln 35-31.  Nebraska RB Rick Berns, soon to be drafted by the Tampa Bay Buccaneers, started the day by tearing off an 82-yard run to set the tone.  Nebraska was able to cling to a slim 3-point halftime lead through the 3rd quarter, but failed to answer Missouri's final touchdown with 3:42 remaining to play, which subsequently and unexpectedly sent both Oklahoma and Nebraska to the Orange Bowl to once again face each other.

Oklahoma

Just six weeks prior, Oklahoma and Nebraska met for the 1978 revisit of the "Game of the Century." Yet circumstances dictated that they would meet again for a rematch. Nebraska led the first down battle 27-17 and led Oklahoma in the air 220-47 as well as in total offense, but was hurt by two lost interceptions. Although behind by 7 at the half and falling to 31-10 by the end of the 3rd, the Cornhuskers rallied back and had a chance until IB Craig Johnson was stopped on a 4th-and-1 for no gain on the Sooners 7 with 8:07 left. Nebraska got the ball back and put it into the end zone again with :03 left on the clock to come within 7 points for the final score.

Rankings

Awards

NFL and Pro Players
The following Nebraska players who participated in the 1978 season later moved on to the next level and joined a professional or semi-pro team as draftees or free agents.

References

Nebraska
Nebraska Cornhuskers football seasons
Big Eight Conference football champion seasons
Nebraska Cornhuskers football